Yeami Dunia (born 16 December 1996) is a Sierra Leonean footballer who plays as a full-back for Bo Rangers.

References

External links
 

Living people
1996 births
Sierra Leonean footballers
Sportspeople from Freetown
Association football fullbacks
FC Johansen players
East End Lions F.C. players
Sierra Leone international footballers
2021 Africa Cup of Nations players